Friedrich Wilhelm Herzog (30 March 1902 – 3 November 1976) was a German writer and music critic.

Life 
Born in Oldenburg, Herzog joined the National Socialist German Workers' Party in 1931 and became head of the music department of the Militant League for German Culture. After the Machtergreifung by the Nazi, he and 87 other writers signed the Gelöbnis treuester Gefolgschaft to Adolf Hitler in October 1933. In 1934, he published the book Was ist deutsche Musik in which he wrote: "We want music that is filled with the expressive power of the National Socialist idea." In the same year on 1 July, he became editor of the magazine Die Musik, Organ der NS-Kulturgemeinde. At the end of August 1935, Herzog was briefly held in Gestapo custody because, according to the diary entries of Goebbels, he had seriously insulted his wife Magda. This only harmed him in the short term, however, because in 1936 he was promoted from editor to editor of the journal Die Musik by the editor-in-chief. However, he was later replaced by Herbert Gerigk. The latter judged thus Herzog: "Herzog made Die Musik into an uncompromisingly managed organ of National Socialist culture.“

After the Second World War Herzog worked as a music teacher. He died in his hometown Oldenburg in 1976 at the age of 74.

Work 
 Wilhelm Backhaus. Der Pianist der Totalität, Berlin 1935  (Musikalische Schriftenreihe der NS-Kulturgemeinde, H. 8)

References

External links 
 

20th-century German writers
German music critics
Nazi Party members
1902 births
1976 deaths
People from Oldenburg (city)